Devrao Namdevrao Pathrikar Kamble was an Indian politician and the member of parliament, who was representing Nanded parliamentary constituency. He was elected during the first lok sabha and second general elections of India, and was affiliated with Indian National Congress political party.

Life and background 
Kamble did his matriculation in Marathi literature (sahitya), and Doctor of Science in Homoeopathy. Prior to this, he was initially studying at a government junior high school situated in Pathri, and in modern-day Yogeshwari Mahavidyalaya in Ambajogai area of Mominabad. He also served as a Headmaster at a government primary school in Parbhani city of Maharashtra.

References 

Indian National Congress politicians
India MPs 1952–1957
Year of death missing
India MPs 1957–1962
1919 births
Place of death missing
Maharashtra politicians
Indian National Congress politicians from Maharashtra